Bartosch Gaul (born 5 October 1987) is a German football manager of Polish descent who was most recently in charge of Ekstraklasa club Górnik Zabrze.

Career

Youth teams of Schalke 04
At the start of the 2008–09 season, Gaul became Dirk Reimöller's assistant coach in Schalke 04 U17s, a position he held until 2010. He then worked for two seasons as the head coach of the Schalke youth team, before becoming Norbert Elgert's assistant coach in the under-19 team in July 2012. In his last season in charge, the youth team led by Thilo Kehrer, who would go on to become a German international, won the German championship in the final against TSG 1899 Hoffenheim.

Youth teams of Mainz 05
In July 2015, Gaul joined the youth department of Mainz 05 as a coach and a coordinator. At the start of the 2018–19 season, he was appointed as manager of Mainz 05 II, playing in Regionalliga Südwest. In four years, he oversaw the team in 135 games before leaving in June 2022.

Górnik Zabrze
On 23 June 2022, Gaul was announced as the new head coach of Polish Ekstraklasa club Górnik Zabrze. On 18 March 2023, one day after leading his team to a 3–2 comeback win against Wisła Płock, which promoted Górnik to the 14th spot in the league table, Gaul was replaced at his post by Górnik's previous manager Jan Urban.

Managerial statistics

References

External links
 

1987 births
Living people
People from Bytów County
German people of Polish descent
German football managers
Polish football managers
Górnik Zabrze managers
Ekstraklasa managers